Carson McMillan (born September 10, 1988) is a Canadian professional ice hockey forward who is currently playing for Löwen Frankfurt of the Deutsche Eishockey Liga (DEL). He was selected by the Minnesota Wild in the 7th round (200th overall) of the 2007 NHL Entry Draft.

Playing career
McMillan made his NHL debut with the Wild on April 3, 2011 and scored a goal in his first NHL game against goaltender Jimmy Howard of the Detroit Red Wings.

In the 2014–15 season, after 13 games with the Toronto Marlies and time with ECHL affiliate, the Orlando Solar Bears, McMillan was traded to the Bridgeport Sound Tigers in exchange for Peter Sivak on February 20, 2015.

On September 29, 2015, McMillan signed as a free agent to a one-year contract in the ECHL with the Idaho Steelheads.

Career statistics

References

External links

1988 births
Living people
Bridgeport Sound Tigers players
Calgary Hitmen players
Canadian expatriate ice hockey players in Denmark
Canadian ice hockey right wingers
EfB Ishockey players
Fischtown Pinguins players
Houston Aeros (1994–2013) players
Ice hockey people from Manitoba
Idaho Steelheads (ECHL) players
Iowa Wild players
Löwen Frankfurt players
Minnesota Wild draft picks
Minnesota Wild players
Orlando Solar Bears (ECHL) players
Sportspeople from Brandon, Manitoba
Toronto Marlies players
Winkler Flyers players